The depressor septi nasi muscle (or depressor alae nasi muscle) is a muscle of the face. It connects the incisive fossa of the maxilla and the orbicularis oris muscle to the nasal septum of the nose. It draws the ala of the nose downwards, reducing the size of the nostrils.

Structure 
The depressor septi nasi muscle arises from the incisive foramen of the maxilla. It may also partially originate from the orbicularis oris muscle. Its fibers ascend to be inserted into the nasal septum and back part of the alar part of nasalis muscle.

It lies between the mucous membrane and the muscular structure of the lip.

Function
The depressor septi is a direct antagonist of the other muscles of the nose, drawing the ala of the nose downward, constricting the nostrils.

It works like the alar part of the nasalis muscle.

Clinical significance 
During rhinoplasty, repositioning of the head of the depressor septi nasi muscle ensures normal nose position after surgery. Various approaches may be used, with similar results.

Additional images

References

Muscles of the head and neck